Jordan Andrew Davies (pronounced 'Davis') (born 18 August 1998) is a Welsh professional footballer who plays as a midfielder for Wrexham. Born in Wrexham, Davies joined the local team's academy.  He joined Cymru Premier side Bangor on a short-term loan the day after his 18th birthday. Following an unsuccessful stint at Brighton, he re-signed for Wrexham in 2020.

Davies has represented Wales U17 in a one-off appearance in 2015 and Wales U19 in a duel against the Czech Republic U19 in 2016.

Club career

Bangor (loan)
Following impressive displays within the Wrexham academy, Davies joined Cymru Premier side Bangor on a short-term loan the day after his 18th birthday. Davies made 14 appearances in four months at Bangor with his performances leading to comparisons with Gareth Bale by former Wales international Andy Legg. Following the conclusion the loan, Bangor made an offer to sign Davies on a permanent basis. However, this offer was rejected by Wrexham.

Brighton & Hove Albion
Championship leaders Brighton & Hove Albion signed him to a two-and-a-half-year contract for an undisclosed fee shortly after his return to Wrexham. Davies was selected and scored his first professional goal in the EFL Trophy victory over Peterborough United in October 2018. On 10 June 2020, Davies was released by the club.

Wrexham
Following his release by Brighton at the conclusion of the 2019–2020 Premier League season, Davies re-signed with Wrexham on a two-year contract. In his first season back at the Racecourse, Davies played a central role as Wrexham narrowly missed out on the National League playoffs on the final day of the season. This season included Davies scoring the first hattrick of his professional career in the April win over Halifax Town.

On 1 January 2022, Davies signed a three-and-a-half-year extension with Wrexham.

Honours
Brighton & Hove Albion
PL2 Division Two Play-Off Winners: 2017-18

Wrexham
FA Trophy: runner-up: 2021–22

Individual
Wrexham Young Player of the Season: 2020–21
Wrexham Players' Player of the Season: 2021–22
National League Team of the Season: 2021–22

References

1998 births
Living people
Footballers from Wrexham
Welsh footballers
Wrexham A.F.C. players
Bangor City F.C. players
Brighton & Hove Albion F.C. players